Viktor Drobinsky (3 October 1932 – December 1997) was a Soviet swimmer. He competed in two events at the 1952 Summer Olympics.

References

1932 births
1997 deaths
Soviet male swimmers
Olympic swimmers of the Soviet Union
Swimmers at the 1952 Summer Olympics
Swimmers from Moscow